South Sydney may refer to:

 City of South Sydney, a former local government area in Sydney, Australia
 Southern Sydney, the southern suburbs of Sydney
 South Sydney Rabbitohs, a National Rugby League team